Humko Tumse Pyaar Hai is a 2006 Indian romantic musical film directed by Bunty Soorma and starring Bobby Deol, Amisha Patel, and Arjun Rampal. The film's premise revolves around a blind woman who struggles to come to terms with her first love, who has apparently been killed, and a new love who wants to help her move on with her life.

This film received mixed reviews and was a box office bomb, however Bobby Deol's performance was praised by critics..

Plot 
Durga is a blind woman with a talent for shaping pottery. She is poor and lives with her widowed mother in a village. She meets Rohit aka Babu, who saves her life. The pair become friends and fall in love. Durga creates a clay bust of Rohit by feeling Rohit's facial features, but weeps because she cannot see it. Rohit tells her he will find a way to help her see again.

When Durga's mother is killed by village goon Rana, Rohit promises to marry her and take care of her. He takes her to a hospital where she will have surgery to regain her sight. While she is recovering (before the bandages are removed), Rana, angry that he was rejected by Durga, attempts to murder Rohit, who goes missing.

Upon receiving news of Rohit's death, Durga goes into depression. Dr. Prasad, her doctor, takes her under his wing and takes her to Switzerland. There, she meets Raj, a businessman who falls in love with her. He, too, is grieving a dead friend and recognizes that Durga is also lonely. Through his persistence and kindness, Durga finally accepts Raj's marriage proposal. Unknown to both, Durga's first love and Raj's dead friend are the same man, Rohit.

On the day of Raj and Durga's engagement, Raj is told that Rohit is alive and has been in a coma for six months but has woken up and is in a hospital. Raj retrieves Rohit, and they return to the house in time for the engagement. Rohit is shocked to discover that Raj's fiancée is Durga but stays quiet for his friend's happiness.

Raj introduces Rohit to Durga, but Rohit purposely doesn't speak in front of her so as to avoid her recognizing his voice. However, Durga overhears Rohit speak, recognizes his voice, and confronts him, wanting to know whether Rohit is really the man she loved. Rohit denies it but Durga is not convinced. She calls Dr. Prasad, as he had met Rohit before, but the doctor tells her that Rohit is not her long lost love, following Rohit's instructions to lie to her. Durga then accepts this and does not question Rohit anymore.

One night, the lights go out in Raj's home, and Durga and Rohit bump into each other. In the dark, Durga's hand goes up to feel Rohit's face, which she recognizes. Rohit flees, and in tears, Durga blindfolds herself and recreates the clay bust of her love, relying on memory alone. When it's completed, she realizes the truth but Rohit asks her whether it would be right to destroy Raj's happiness after all he has been through. Durga reluctantly agrees and they decide to keep the secret.

On the day of the wedding, Raj publicly confronts the pair. He accuses Rohit of trying to steal Durga from him. Rohit quietly accepts the accusation but Durga gets defensive and speaks up for him, exposing the truth of their past. It is then revealed that Raj's behavior was a ruse to make them reveal the truth. He gladly steps aside to reunite the lovers.

Cast 
Bobby Deol as Raj Malhotra
Arjun Rampal as Rohit 'Babu'
Ameesha Patel as Durga
Suhasini Mulay as Durga's mother
Parmeet Sethi as Rana
Kanwaljit Singh as Dr. R. K. Prasad
Achint Kaur
Anang Desai as Mr. Malhotra, Raj’s father
Beena Banerjee as Mrs. Malhotra, Raj’s mother
Asha Sharma as Raj's Grandmother
Vivek Shauq

Soundtrack 
The soundtrack was composed by Anand Raj Anand and Lyrics by Dev Kohli. Singers like Kumar Sanu, Udit Narayan, Sukhwinder Singh, Alka Yagnik, Babul Supriyo & Sapna Awasthi have lent their voices for the songs of the film.

References

External links 
 

2006 films
2000s Hindi-language films
Indian romantic musical films
Films directed by Vikram Bhatt
Films scored by Anand Raj Anand
Indian romantic drama films
2006 romantic drama films
2000s romantic musical films